London Taxi: Rush Hour (stylized as London Taxi: RusHour) is a budget title from Data Design Interactive and Metro 3D released across multiple platforms.

Plot
The player needs to choose a cab and driver then pick up hitchhikers and drive them to their destinations while speeding through traffic, going on sidewalks, and driving onto ramps through mid-air. It has been classified as a clone of the classic game franchise Crazy Taxi. Also because this game has no traffic lights, stop signs, or even law enforcers, the cab drivers get to ignore the speed limit and ram and/or evade other vehicles on the road just like in Crazy Taxi.

Reception

The PlayStation 2 version received "generally unfavorable reviews", while the Wii version received "overwhelming dislike", according to the review aggregation website Metacritic.

References

2006 video games
Data Design Interactive games
Metro3D games
PlayStation 2 games
Racing video games
Video games about taxis
Video games developed in the United Kingdom
Video games set in London
Wii games
Windows games